Surp Harutyun (Armenian: Սուրբ Յարութիւն, 'Holy Resurrection') may refer to:

 Taksim Surp Harutyun Church, an Armenian Church in Istanbul, Turkey
 Sourp Haroutiun Chapel, Nicosia, Cyprus
 The church of Surp Harutyun, Kecharis Monastery, Armenia

See also
 Church of the Holy Sepulchre, Jerusalem